Edward Jones-Imhotep is a historian of science and technology, academic and Director and Associate Professor at the Institute for the History and Philosophy of Science and Technology, University of Toronto. He received his  Ph.D. in History of Science from Harvard University in 2001.

He was a recipient of the Mellon Fellowship from the Andrew W. Mellon Foundation in Humanistic Studies in 1995. Jones-Imhotep's research lies at the intersection of historical and philosophical questions surrounding the modern physical sciences and technology.

His book The Unreliable Nation: Hostile Nature and Technological Failure in the Cold War (MIT Press, 2017) won the Society for the History of Technology's 2018 Sidney M. Edelstein Prize for an outstanding book, citing the book's "place of technology in modern history which puts the book into dialogue with the vast literatures on envirotech, on technology and state-building, on Cold War science and technology, and on modernity."

See also
American philosophy
List of American philosophers

References

External links
 Personal website

1972 births
Living people
Canadian people of American descent
21st-century Canadian historians
Canadian male non-fiction writers
21st-century American historians
21st-century American male writers
Historians of science
Canadian philosophers
American philosophers
African-American academics
Philosophers of science
York University alumni
Harvard University alumni
Academic staff of McMaster University
Academic staff of the University of Guelph
Academic staff of York University
American male non-fiction writers
21st-century African-American writers
African-American male writers